Archingeay is a commune in the Charente-Maritime department in the Nouvelle-Aquitaine region of southwestern France.

The inhabitants of the commune are known as Arcantois or Arcantoises.

Geography
Archingeay is located some 32 km south of Surgeres and 30 km east of Rochefort. Access to the commune is by the D114 road which branches off the D739E south of Tonnay-Boutonne and continues south through the commune and village to Saint-Savinien. The D122 also goes south-west from the village to join the D124 which continues to Bords. The D122E1 also goes east from the village to Beaujouet. Apart from the village there are also the hamlets of:

Charnais
Cheniers
Chez Bayeau
Chez Brandeau
Chez Brard
Chez Pepin
Chez Trancard
Coulon
Fontaudet
L'Aiguille
Le Mouton
Le Tricholet
Les Pavageauds
Port L'Aubier

The commune is mixed forest and farmland.

The Boutonne river forms much of the north-western border of the commune with a network of irrigation canals covering the western part of the commune. Le Pepin stream rises south of the village and flows west into the Boutonne.

Neighbouring communes and villages

Toponymy
The name may come from the name of the Roman general Arcantius.

History
This commune had an Abbey which has completely disappeared.

In the past, Archingeay enjoyed a flourishing period, mainly due to a hot spring near the Chateau of the Valley to the west of Archingeay and renowned for its therapeutic properties (digestive diseases, skin etc.). Among other famous spa guests, the Roman general Arcantius took its waters.

Until the attack of phylloxera there was manufacturing of pottery, bricks and tiles, and wine production.

Administration

List of Successive Mayors

Demography
In 2017 the commune had 671 inhabitants.

Distribution of Age Groups
The population of the town is younger than the departmental average.

Percentage Distribution of Age Groups in Archingeay and Charente-Maritime Department in 2017

Source: INSEE

Sites and Monuments

The Romanesque Church of Saint Martin (12th century) is registered as an historical monument. It has sculptures at the south door and both interior and exterior corbels depicting life at the time. the main Altar and Tabernacle (18th century) are registered as an historical object.
A Ferruginous Fountain known by the Romans for healing properties (skin diseases). In the Gallo-Roman period, the Roman general Arcantius spent time at the spa.
A Lavoir (Public Laundry) dating from Roman times.
The Trésors de Lisette Museum which presents family life in the early 20th century with one of the largest exhibitions of old culinary objects in Europe. It opens during June, July and August from 3 p.m. (15:00) to 7 p.m. (19:00).

Notable People linked to the commune
Saint Malo, who founded the city of Saint-Malo, died at Archingeay.
Arcantius, a Roman general who took the waters of a thermal spring at La Vallée which was renowned for its therapeutic properties
The Montaigne Family who lived in the Chateau of the Valley.

See also
Communes of the Charente-Maritime department

References

External links
 Archingeay on the National Geographic Institute website 
Archingeay on Géoportail, National Geographic Institute (IGN) website 
Archingeay on the 1750 Cassini Map

Communes of Charente-Maritime